A list of films produced in South Korea in 1973:

External links
1973 in South Korea

 1970-1979 at www.koreanfilm.org

1973
South Korean
1973 in South Korea